Hemavin Kadhalargal is a 1985 Indian Tamil-language film directed by T. V. Chandran. It is T. V. Chandran's first widely released film, first Tamil film and overall, second film. Actress Anuradha made her debut with this film. It was released on 27 December 1985.

Plot

Cast 
 Delhi Ganesh
 Anuradha
Shanthi Krishna
 J. R. Balaiah
 Kumar
 M. S. Moorthy
 R. K. Raman
 Ramki
 Sudheesh
 Vijai Mohan
 Sabitha Anand
 Sujatha Rao

Soundtrack 
Soundtrack was composed by Raveendran.
Paarvai Theril Pogum – S. P. Balasubramaniam

Reception 
Jaya Manmadhan of Kalki praised Anuradha's performance and music but criticised the film for portraying men as womanisers and drunkards. He concluded the review saying everyone in the film is normal, but very calm, between one sentence and another, one can go to the central station and make a reservation for the Delhi train.

References

External links 

1980s Tamil-language films
1985 films
Films directed by T. V. Chandran
Films scored by Raveendran